Nonnie & Alex is a 1995 short film that Todd Field directed while a fellow at the AFI Conservatory. It was filmed in Ferndale, California. This short film is a dramatic piece about two eight-year-old children, a girl (Nonnie) and boy (her friend, Alex) who are left to their own devices in trying to sort out whether or not Alex's recently deceased mother is truly haunting them.

Awards
Sundance Film Festival (Special Recognition Award)
Aspen Short Fest (Best Film)
Academy of Television Arts & Sciences (Emmy Award – Best College Film)

References

External links
 

1995 films
1995 short films
Films directed by Todd Field
American short films
1990s English-language films